Michigan's at-large congressional district may refer to a few different occasions when a statewide at-large district was used for elections to the United States House of Representatives from Michigan.

Prior to Michigan's admittance as a state of the Union in 1837, congressional delegates for Michigan Territory were elected from Michigan Territory's at-large congressional district.  The first elected U.S. representative from the state was elected October 5 and 6, 1835. However, due to Michigan's dispute with Ohio over the Toledo Strip, Congress refused to accept his credentials until it admitted Michigan to the Union as a state on January 26, 1837.

In 1912, Patrick H. Kelley was elected congressman at-large after Michigan gained one seat due to reapportionment following the 1910 census, but Michigan did not redraw its congressional districts until 1913.

In 1962, Neil Staebler was elected as an at-large candidate after the 1960 census indicated Michigan would gain a seat in the House of Representatives, but the 19th district had not been created at the time of the election.

List of members representing the district

References

 Congressional Biographical Directory of the United States 1774–present

At-large
At-large United States congressional districts
Former congressional districts of the United States
Constituencies established in 1837
1837 establishments in Michigan
Constituencies disestablished in 1843
1843 disestablishments in Michigan
Constituencies established in 1913
1913 establishments in Michigan
Constituencies disestablished in 1915
1915 disestablishments in Michigan
Constituencies established in 1963
1963 establishments in Michigan
Constituencies disestablished in 1965
1965 disestablishments in Michigan